Tess Henley is an American singer-songwriter and pianist from Kent, Washington, United States. Born into a musical family, Henley studied and performed since childhood before launching a career performing soul music. Since 2008, she has released several full-length albums, EPs, and singles and made her television debut on Jimmy Kimmel Live! in 2015.

Early life
Tess grew up as a middle child born to a professional singer. She is the younger sister of musician Carson Henley. She started taking Suzuki Method piano lessons at the age of 3. Henley graduated as valedictorian from Kentlake High School in Kent, Washington in 2006 where she played year-round basketball and soccer. In 2010, Henley graduated from University of Washington with a degree in Communications.

Career
In 2008, Henley released her debut album, Easy to Love. In 2011, Tess won Budweiser’s National Superfest Summer Block Party competition to win $25,000 and opened for Jill Scott and Anthony Hamilton (musician).
Also during 2011, Henley was a top three finalist in R&B category for the John Lennon Worldwide Songwriting Competition, the winner of the 2011 International Song Competition for SoulTracks. and the winner of an Independent Music Award in 2012.

After releasing a deluxe edition of Easy to Love through Tower Records Japan in September 2011, Tess released a 7" vinyl in October 2011 of the duet, "What You Won't Do for Love", featuring Mycle Wastman from The Voice, for the Japan Earthquake and Tsunami Relief Fund.

In September 2012, Tess' track "Boy in the Window" film Hello I Must Be Going. This song also garnered her an Independent Music Award.

In May 2013, Henley released her sophomore studio album High Heels & Sneakers, produced by Dice Raw from The Roots and Khari Mateen. Also in 2013, Tess received the Vox Pop R&B/Soul Independent Music Award for "Daydreaming." Henley was then named grand prize winner of the Show Me The Music Songwriting Contest with her song, "Who Are You."

Producer Don Was selected Tess as the Guitar Center Singer-Songwriter III grand prize winner in March 2014. She became the first female winner in the competition's history, receiving $25,000, music gear, and an EP to be recorded with Don Was.

In mid-August 2014, Henley went to Henson Recording Studios in Los Angeles with producer Was and session musicians Mike Finnigan, James Gadson, Mark Goldenberg, James "Hutch" Hutchinson, Davide Rossi, and Michito Sanchez to record. The album Wonderland was released in early 2015. On January 22, 2015, Henley made her national television debut on Jimmy Kimmel Live!, performing "Positively Me" and "Wonderland" from the album. Teen Vogue premiered the music video for "Wonderland".

Discography
Albums

Singles

References

External links

1987 births
Living people
Singers from Washington (state)
American soul singers
People from Kent, Washington
University of Washington College of Arts and Sciences alumni
21st-century American singers